Philip Fahrner (born 2 January 2003) is a German footballer who plays as a midfielder for SC Freiburg II.

Career statistics

References

2003 births
Living people
German footballers
Association football midfielders
3. Liga players
SSV Reutlingen 05 players
SC Freiburg players
SC Freiburg II players